Monastyryska Raion was a raion in Ternopil Oblast in western Ukraine. Its administrative center was the city of Monastyryska. The raion was abolished on 18 July 2020 as part of the administrative reform of Ukraine, which reduced the number of raions of Ternopil Oblast to three. The area of Monastyryska Raion was merged into Chortkiv Raion. The last estimate of the raion population was 

The raion was created in 1939 during the World War II when Poland was partitioned between Nazi Germany and Soviet Union. Monastyryska Raion was created out of former Buchach County. Couple of years later it was abolished following the invasion of the Soviet Union by Nazi Germany. The raion was reinstated in 1944 after return of the Soviet regime.

Subdivisions
At the time of disestablishment, the raion consisted of two hromadas:
 Koropets settlement hromada with the administration in the urban-type settlement of Koropets;
 Monastyryska urban hromada with the administration in Monastyryska.

People from Monastyryska Raion
 Volodymyr Hnatiuk – (1871–1926), writer, literary scholar, translator, and journalist, and was one of the most influential and notable Ukrainian ethnographers.

See also
 Subdivisions of Ukraine

References

Former raions of Ternopil Oblast
1939 establishments in Ukraine
Ukrainian raions abolished during the 2020 administrative reform